Josephine Karungi, is a Ugandan journalist and television personality who works as a media and communications consultant at the World Bank Uganda, based at their offices in Kampala, Uganda's capital city. Before that, from 1 October 2018 until 30 March 2021, she served as Head of News, at NTV Uganda, in acting capacity. In that role, she reported directly to the general manager, Editorial, Daniel Kalinaki.

Karungi was born in Uganda. She attended Nakasero Primary School, in Kampala. Then joined St. Lawrence Citizens High school, Horizon Campus for Secondary Education. Later she was admitted to Makerere University, Uganda's largest and oldest public university, in Kampala, where she graduated with a Bachelor of Mass Communication degree.

Career
She joined Nation Television Uganda (NTV Uganda) in 2009 as an English language news anchor. Produced and hosted the Sunday night lifestyle television talk show, Perspective With Josephine Karungi. In October 2018, she was appointed Head of News at NTV Uganda, replacing Maurice Mugisha, who was hired by Uganda Broadcasting Corporation, as their new Deputy managing director. she was later appointed as the Communications manager with World Bank before leaving Nation Media Group .

In March 2021, she was replaced as NTV Uganda's Head of News, by Faridah Nakazibwe.

Family
Karungi was married to Vince Musisi, a Ugandan record producer, the pair had a private ceremony which took place at the Speke Resort Munyonyo, on the northern shores of Lake Victoria. The couple are parents to a son.

Other considerations
In January 2017, the Daily Monitor newspaper named her, one of "Uganda's most likely influential people in 2017".

See also
Faridah Nakazibwe
Flavia Tumusiime
Sanyu Robinah Mweruka

References

External links
Website Nation Television Uganda
Maurice Mugisha quits NTV, Josephine Karungi takes over As of 1 October 2018.

Living people
1985 births
Ugandan journalists
Ugandan women journalists
Ugandan women television journalists
Makerere University alumni